Mawari-ike Dam  is an earthfill dam located in Kyoto Prefecture in Japan. The dam is used for irrigation. The catchment area of the dam is 5.4 km2. The dam impounds about 10  ha of land when full and can store 950 thousand cubic meters of water. The construction of the dam was completed in 1880.

See also
List of dams in Japan

References

Dams in Kyoto Prefecture